44/876 is a collaborative album by English musician Sting and Jamaican musician Shaggy. It was released on 20 April 2018 by A&M Records, Interscope Records and Cherrytree Records.

The album's title refers to the country calling code for the United Kingdom (+44) and the North American area code for Jamaica (876), Sting's and Shaggy's respective home countries.

On 7 December 2018 the Deluxe Softpack 8-bonus-track CD edition of the album was released including the unreleased track "Skank Up (Oh Lawd)", two new versions of "Gotta Get Back My Baby" and five unreleased acoustic live tracks recorded in July 2018 in Paris.

The album won an award for Best Reggae Album at the 61st Grammy Awards in February 2019.

Commercial performance
In the United Kingdom, 44/876 debuted at number nine on the UK Albums Chart with first-week sales of 7,658 units. It is Sting's first top 10-album since Sacred Love (2003), and Shaggy's first since Hot Shot (2000).

"Don't Make Me Wait" was also included in Sting's Duets album in 2021.

Track listing

Personnel

Shaggy – vocals
Sting – bass, producer, backing vocals
Aidonia – lead vocals (1)
Morgan Heritage – backing vocals (1)
David T.V. Barnes – horn
Andy Bassford – guitar
Maggie Buckley – flute, saxophone
Kameron Corvet – guitar, producer
Shaun Darson – drum fills
Robert Dubwise – guitar
Dwayne Shippy – additional production, bass, guitar, instrumentation, keyboards, percussion, producer, sounds, string arrangements, backing vocals
Kennard Garrett – producer
Clark Gayton – mastering, trombone
Joel Gonzalez – horn
Gene Grimaldi – mastering
Shane Hoosong – additional production, drums, keyboards, percussion, producer, sounds
Zach Jones – drums, backing vocals
Geoffrey Keezer – piano
Heather Kierszenbaum – sounds
Martin Kierszenbaum – additional production, back cover photo, bass, clavichord, drums, editing, executive producer, Fender Rhodes, guitar, keyboards, organ, percussion, piano, producer, sounds, synthesizer
Tony Lake – engineer
Zachary Lucas – horn
Machine Gun Funk – drums, keyboards, producer
Branford Marsalis – saxophone
Steven "Lenky" Marsden – keyboards
Kamari Martin – backing vocals
Dominic Miller – guitar
Melissa Musique – backing vocals
Gene Noble – backing vocals
Salvador Ochoa – cover photo
Robert Orton – engineer, mixing, percussion, synthesizer
Danny Quatrochi – guitar technician
Dave Richards – bass
Glenn Rogers – guitar
Robbie Shakespeare – bass
Shaun "Sting International" Pizzonia – bas dessus, bass, drums, editing, engineer, guitar, instrumentation, keyboards, mixing, percussion, producer, sounds, backing vocals
Robert Stringer – horn
Eliot Sumner – vocals
Teflon – drums, keyboards, producer
Grant Valentine – assistant engineer
Nicole VanGiesen – photography
Liam Ward – art direction, design
Karl Wright – drums
Joan Campbell – actor

Charts

Weekly charts

Year-end charts

Certifications

References

2018 albums
A&M Records albums
Interscope Records albums
Cherrytree Records albums
Shaggy (musician) albums
Sting (musician) albums
Albums produced by Martin Kierszenbaum
Reggae albums by English artists
Collaborative albums